Drikus Coetzee (born 15 April 1993) is a Namibian cyclist.

Major results
Sources:

2017
 National Road Championships
3rd Time trial
5th Road race
2018
 National Road Championships
1st   Time trial
2nd Road race
 5th African Time Trial Championships
 9th Overall Tour de Limpopo
2019
 National Road Championships
1st   Time trial
4th Road race
2020
 National Road Championships
1st   Time trial
3rd Road race
2021
 National Road Championships
1st   Time trial
1st  Road race
2022
 National Road Championships
1st  Road race
2nd Time trial
2023
 National Road Championships
1st  Time trial
2nd Road race

References

External links

1993 births
Living people
Namibian male cyclists
Sportspeople from Swakopmund
White Namibian people
21st-century Namibian people